The Majestic Cinema is a cinema in King's Lynn, Norfolk, England.

History 

The Majestic Cinema was built in 1928 and run by Ernest Ralph Adams of Ripley House, King's Lynn. He worked closely with the architects John Lewis Carnell and William Dymoke White in the design and construction of the Majestic. Mr. Adams bought the contents of the Empire Theatre, Leicester Square, London (which was being demolished) and these, once restored, formed part of the interior of the Majestic. The 'Picture House' (as it was initially known) opened on May 23rd, 1928 with the silent film version of 'Ben Hur', starring Ramon Navarro. The ownership of the cinema later passed to Union and subsequently ABC Cinemas. The original ballroom was used as a venue by King George V for his Sandringham Hunt Balls.

2001: Multiplex demolition proposal 
In , a scheme to demolish the Majestic Cinema and build a Multiplex in its place was denied. The plans were submitted to the Borough Council of King's Lynn and West Norfolk by SMM Investments. Objectors to the cinemas demolition included the Lynn Civic Society, the national Cinema and Theatre Association, the Theatres Trust and councillor Dr Paul Richards.
The owner of the Majestic Cinema at the time, Tony Rowlett stated in an interview with Lynn News:

It was made a Grade II listed building in  following lobbying by the Lynn's Civic Society.

A report explaining the plans refusal stated:

References

External links 

Cinemas in Norfolk
Grade II listed buildings in Norfolk
King's Lynn